The San Jose McEnery Convention Center (commonly known simply as the San Jose Convention Center) is a convention center in Downtown San Jose, California. The  facility is the largest convention center in Silicon Valley. It is known for hosting high-profile technology conferences and events like the Apple Worldwide Developers Conference and Facebook F8, as well as non-tech events like FanimeCon and Silicon Valley Comic Con.

The San Jose Convention Center opened in 1989, replacing a convention hall of the same name at San Jose Civic. It is named after Tom McEnery, a former mayor of San Jose. The South Hall opened in 2005, and the main hall was renovated and expanded in 2013. Team San Jose manages the convention center along with several nearby event centers.

Facility

There are entrances on West San Carlos Street, Almaden Boulevard, and South Market Street. The San Jose Hilton and Marriott hotels both adjoin the convention center. A two-story hallway connecting the three entrances is called the "Parkway" on the ground floor and the "Concourse" on the second floor.

A recessed main entrance along West San Carlos Street features two prominent art installations. A tile mural by Lin Utzon (1988) adorns a façade surrounding the entrance. The two-story-tall mural, resembling a flock of birds in flight, consists of over 8,000 red, white, and black porcelain tiles manufactured by Royal Copenhagen. An interactive sculpture, Idea Tree by South Korean architect Soo-in Yang, stands in the plaza fronting the entrance. In the lobby hangs a 1993 life-size bronze and steel sculpture, Winged Guardian by Stephen De Staebler.

It can accommodate 11,428 people, or 5,333 people with exhibits. It is surrounded by a public parking lot on a  site. City leaders have called for the South Hall's demolition at various times since it was erected in 2005 as a temporary structure; nevertheless, the city considers it important for attracting large events to the convention center. The South Hall and surrounding parking lot are owned by the Successor Agency to the Redevelopment Agency (SARA) of San Jose. The South Hall's maintenance costs $38,000 each year, while demolition is estimated to cost at least $1 million.

The convention center is located one block from the San Carlos Street exit of California State Route 87 and two blocks from the Almaden Boulevard exit of southbound Interstate 280. California State Route 82 also passed by the convention center on South Market Street until this portion of the route was relinquished to San Jose in 2013. The public Convention Center Parking Garage is connected to the convention center. Public surface parking lots are located across Almaden Boulevard to the west and across Viola Street surrounding the South Hall.

The convention center is accessible by public transportation. The Convention Center VTA light rail station is located directly in front of the convention center's main entrance on West San Carlos Street. The station is served by the Blue Line and Green Line. The station is two stops away from the intermodal San Jose Diridon station. The convention center is also served by VTA local and express bus routes, San Jose State University's free Downtown Area Shuttle (DASH), and a Bay Wheels bicycle sharing station across West San Carlos Street.

History

The first general-purpose event center in San Jose was the Santa Clara County Horticultural Society's Horticultural Hall, which operated for about 30 years from 1886 until the Santa Clara County Fairgrounds opened. Civic Auditorium served as the city's main events venue from its opening in 1933 as Municipal Auditorium.

In 1957, voters approved a bond measure for the construction of a modern convention center. Construction on the Jay McCabe Convention Hall began in December 1952, and the facility opened in 1964 with the Loyal Order of Moose national convention.

With the opening of the Anaheim Convention Center in 1967, city officials became dissatisfied with Civic Auditorium and McCabe Hall and sought a replacement. Based on a study by Stanford Research Institute in 1970, the city commissioned architect William Hedley and Hellmuth, Obata + Kassabaum to draw up plans for a "Community Plaza" superblock centered around a new convention hall. In October 1973, Mayor Norman Mineta approved $2.4 million for the new convention hall, which would be a wing of Civic Auditorium (now called San Jose Civic), along with an underground parking structure. However, by November 1974, the plans had been downsized to a mere  of exhibit space and an above-ground parking garage. The new San Jose Convention Center broke ground on November 18, 1975, and was dedicated by Mayor Janet Gray Hayes on September 22, 1977.

The second and current San Jose Convention Center was approved by Mayor Tom McEnery in 1983 as part of an urban renewal project that displaced a low-income, Hispanic neighborhood. The  convention center was designed by Mitchell/Giurgola Architects, Daniel Mann Johnson Mendenhall, and the Steinberg Group. Blount Construction was the general contractor. The new convention center cost $ (equivalent to $ in ) to build, of which the San Jose Redevelopment Agency contributed $ ($). It opened in 1989. Meanwhile, the 1977 convention center was renamed Parkside Hall. "The Garage", now The Tech Interactive, moved into McCabe Hall in 1990. In 1991, the San Jose Convention Center was renamed the San Jose McEnery Convention Center in honor of the former mayor.

In its early years, the new convention center failed to meet attendance and revenue expectations. By 2002, many Silicon Valley businesses were choosing the much larger Moscone Center in San Francisco over the San Jose Convention Center due to the latter's limited space. A ballot measure to finance an expansion via a hotel tax failed to reach the required two-thirds majority to pass. In June 2005, Team San Jose built the South Hall, a $6.77 million, blue and white tent, adding  of exhibit space.

In 2009, local hotels agreed to a hotel tax increase to fund the convention center's renovation and expansion. On October 10, 2013, the convention center completed the $130 million project, which added  on the site of the former Martin Luther King Jr. Library. The San José Public Library relocated its main branch to the Dr. Martin Luther King Jr. Library on the San Jose State University campus.

In 2018, SARA put the South Hall site up for sale.

Events

The convention center hosts hundreds of events each year, including the following annual events:

 Silicon Valley International Auto Show in January
 Furcon in January
 Silicon Valley Comic Con in March (2016–2018), August (from 2019)
 Facebook F8 in April or May (since 2017)
 Big Wow! ComicFest in May
 FanimeCon during Memorial Day weekend in May (since 2004)
 Apple Worldwide Developers Conference May (1989–2002), June (2017–2019)
 Crunchyroll Expo in August or September (since 2018)

Other notable events at the convention center have included:

 1993 and 1996 Windows Hardware Engineering Conference
 1997 ACM/IEEE Supercomputing Conference
 1998 LinuxWorld Conference and Expo
 2002 and 2018 World Science Fiction Convention
 2004 and 2006 Game Developers Conference
 2013 Creative Convergence Silicon Valley
 WrestleMania Axxess for WWE's WrestleMania 31 in 2015
 2016 Conference on Human Factors in Computing Systems
 A rally for Donald Trump's 2016 presidential campaign that prompted rioting
 Genesis 3 and 4 in 2016 and 2017, respectively; The final day of the tournament occurred at City National Civic
 2018 TwitchCon
 The NHL Fan Fair for the 2019 National Hockey League All-Star Game

See also
 List of convention centers in the United States
 Santa Clara County Fairgrounds

References

External links

 

Downtown San Jose
Convention centers in California
Buildings and structures in San Jose, California
Economy of San Jose, California
Tourist attractions in San Jose, California
Event venues established in 1989
1989 establishments in California